The Nigerian Dwarf is an American breed of dwarf goat. Like the American Pygmy Goat, it derives from the West African Dwarf group of breeds of West Africa.

History 

Between about 1930 and 1960 a variety of small goats of the West African Dwarf group of breeds were imported from Africa to the United States to be exhibited in zoos. The Nigerian Dwarf, like the American Pygmy Goat, derives from these, but does not resemble the stocky West African Dwarf in conformation – it has been bred to have the appearance of a miniature dairy goat. It was at first reared as a show breed and companion animal; selection was for appearance and for docility. It was later found to be suitable for small-scale dairy production, and some breeding was directed towards dairy qualities. A herd-book was established in 1980.

Numbers grew rapidly; by 2002 there were almost 7000 head registered. The breed was recognized by the American Dairy Goat Association in 2005. The Nigerian Dwarf was formerly listed on the heritage breeds watchlist of the Livestock Conservancy as "recovering", but was removed from the list in 2013.

In the 1990s the Nigora breed was created by cross-breeding the Nigerian Dwarf with Angora and other mohair breeds.

Characteristics 

The Nigerian Dwarf is small but well-proportioned; its conformation resembles that of larger dairy goats. It may be horned or naturally hornless. The coat is fine and fairly short, and may be of any color, or multicolored; common colors are gold, chocolate and black, frequently with white markings. The facial profile may be concave or straight; the ears are upright.

It is a precocious breed – young stock may be bred from an early age: males from about three months, females from seven or eight months. The gestation period is in the range 145–153 days; the twinning rate is high, and triplet and quadruplet births are not uncommon. Life expectancy is from eight to 12 years.

Use 
The Nigerian Dwarf was originally bred for show and as a companion animal. It was later also bred for dairy use. Lactation usually lasts for about ten months. The milk is high in butterfat and protein, averaging 6.5% and 3.9% respectively, and is suitable for making cheese and butter.

References

External links 
 

Dairy goat breeds
Goat breeds
Goat breeds originating in the United States